Eight of Swords is a Minor Arcana tarot card.
Tarot cards are used throughout much of Europe to play Tarot card games.

In English-speaking countries, where the games are largely unknown, Tarot cards came to be utilized primarily for divinatory purposes.

Divination usage

A woman is tied and blindfolded within a cage of swords. This is the "damned if you do, damned if you don't," card. The Querent is in a situation where they're afraid to move. If they move, they'll get cut. However, the ropes that bind them and the blindfold over their eyes are their own fears, keeping them immobile. Therefore, the longer they stay, the more they constrain and entrap themselves. Ever been in a situation where you're afraid to say anything, so afraid that you second guess yourself, end up saying nothing, tying yourself in knots? But speaking up is going to get you cut to ribbons? That's this card. The Querent must have the strength to endure the cuts or they will stay trapped. They must move, for the longer they let the situation continue, the worse it will get.

References

Suit of Swords